The Aquariums of Pyongyang: Ten Years in the North Korean Gulag, by Kang Chol-hwan and Pierre Rigoulot, is an account of the imprisonment of Kang Chol-Hwan and his family in the Yodok concentration camp in North Korea.

It begins with an introduction by co-author Pierre Rigoulot describing Kang's new life in the Republic of Korea, then continues with a brief history of both North and South Korea since the Korean War in 1953.

The book is about a powerful family with money and material goods that has everything taken from them by the Workers' Party of Korea. Kang's family, while of Korean ethnicity, originally lived in Japan before emigrating to the DPRK at the behest of his communist grandmother. When Kang was nine years old, his grandfather was imprisoned for suspected activity against the State. Because of guilt by association (Sippenhaft), state policy was to incarcerate the immediate family of political prisoners. Kang Chol-Hwan, his grandmother, father, uncle and younger sister Miho were imprisoned at Yodok concentration camp #2915. There they suffered and viewed many atrocities over a ten year period, including disease, starvation, torturous punishments, and public executions.

While in the camp, Kang met Pak Seung-zin, a member of the North Korea national football team in the 1966 FIFA World Cup. He says that Pak and other players had been imprisoned after returning from the tour. However, in the documentary film The Game of Their Lives, Pak and the other players were interviewed and they denied Kang's claim that they had been imprisoned.

Following his family's release (presumably upon the death of his grandfather, the original offender against the State), Kang worked in assigned occupations before becoming at risk of again being sent to a concentration camp. The end of the book details his subsequent escape to China and his attempts to seek asylum before escaping to South Korea.

The most recent publication in 2005 includes an account of his meeting with former U.S. President George W. Bush. According to Victor Cha, President Bush considered the book to be "one of the most important books he read during his presidency." Originally published in French in 2000, and translated into English in 2001 by Yair Reiner and later into Korean, it is one of the first published accounts of the North Korean prison system.

See also
Human rights in North Korea
North Korean literature
Yodok Stories

References

2000 non-fiction books
Human rights abuses in North Korea
Political books
Political repression in North Korea
Books about North Korea
Collaborative non-fiction books